Senator Burgin may refer to:

Jim Burgin (born 1956), North Carolina State Senate
William O. Burgin (1877–1946), North Carolina State Senate